The 2007 NCAA National Collegiate Women's Ice Hockey Tournament involved eight schools playing in single-elimination play to determine the national champion of women's NCAA Division I college ice hockey. It began on March 9, 2007, and ended with the championship game on March 18. The quarterfinals were conducted at the homes of the seeded teams, and the Frozen Four was conducted at Lake Placid, NY. A total of seven games were played.

NCAA Frozen Four
Quarterfinals held at home sites of seeded teams

Note: * denotes overtime period(s)

References

NCAA Women's Division I Ice Hockey Tournament
NCAA Women's Ice Hockey Tournament
Ice hockey in New York (state)
Sports competitions in New York (state)
2007 in sports in New York (state)